The 2005 Wimbledon Championships was a tennis tournament played on grass courts at the All England Lawn Tennis and Croquet Club in Wimbledon, London in the United Kingdom. It was the 119th edition of the Wimbledon Championships and were held from 20 June to 3 July 2005. It was the third Grand Slam tennis event of the year.

Roger Federer successfully defended the men's singles crown defeating Andy Roddick in the final for the second consecutive year. Maria Sharapova was unsuccessful in her 2004 title defence, being defeated in the semifinals by eventual champion Venus Williams. Williams and Lindsay Davenport played the longest women's final in history.

Point and prize money distribution

Point distribution
Below are the tables with the point distribution for each discipline of the tournament.

Senior points

Prize distribution
The total prize money for 2005 championships was £10,085,510. The winner of the men's title earned £630,000 while the women's singles champion earned £600,000.

* per team

Champions

Seniors

Men's singles

 Roger Federer defeated  Andy Roddick, 6–2, 7–6(7–2), 6–4

Women's singles

 Venus Williams defeated  Lindsay Davenport, 4–6, 7–6(7–4), 9–7

Men's doubles

 Stephen Huss /  Wesley Moodie defeated  Bob Bryan /  Mike Bryan, 7–6(7–4), 6–3, 6–7(2–7), 6–3

Women's doubles

 Cara Black /  Liezel Huber defeated  Svetlana Kuznetsova /  Amélie Mauresmo, 6–2, 6–1

Mixed doubles

 Mahesh Bhupathi /  Mary Pierce defeated  Paul Hanley /  Tatiana Perebiynis, 6–4, 6–2

Juniors

Boys' singles

 Jérémy Chardy defeated   Robin Haase, 6–4, 6–3

Girls' singles

 Agnieszka Radwańska defeated  Tamira Paszek, 6–3, 6–4

Boys' doubles

 Jesse Levine /  Michael Shabaz defeated  Sam Groth /  Andrew Kennaugh, 6–4, 6–1

Girls' doubles

 Victoria Azarenka /  Ágnes Szávay defeated  Marina Erakovic /  Monica Niculescu, 6–7(5–7), 6–2, 6–0

Other events

Wheelchair men's doubles

 Michaël Jeremiasz /  Jayant Mistry defeated  David Hall /  Martin Legner, 4–6, 6–3, 7–6

Singles seeds

Men's singles
  Roger Federer (champion)
  Andy Roddick (final, lost to Roger Federer)
  Lleyton Hewitt (semifinals, lost to Roger Federer)
  Rafael Nadal (second round, lost to Gilles Müller)
  Marat Safin (third round, lost to Feliciano López)
  Tim Henman (second round, lost to Dmitry Tursunov)
  Guillermo Cañas (withdrew)
  Nikolay Davydenko (second round, lost to Jonas Björkman)
  Sébastien Grosjean (quarterfinals, lost to Andy Roddick)
  Mario Ančić (fourth round, lost to Feliciano López)
  Joachim Johansson (third round, lost to Fernando González)
  Thomas Johansson (semifinals, lost to Andy Roddick)
  Tommy Robredo (first round, lost to Fernando Verdasco)
  Radek Štěpánek (second round, lost to Andy Murray)
  Guillermo Coria (fourth round, lost to Roger Federer)
  Mariano Puerta (first round, lost to Lars Burgsmüller)
  David Ferrer (first round, lost to Guillermo García López)
  David Nalbandian (quarterfinals, lost to Thomas Johansson)
  Tommy Haas (first round, lost to Janko Tipsarević)
  Ivan Ljubičić (first round, lost to Jürgen Melzer)
  Fernando González (quarterfinals, lost to Roger Federer)
  Dominik Hrbatý (second round, lost to Gaël Monfils)
  Juan Carlos Ferrero (fourth round, lost to Roger Federer)
  Taylor Dent (fourth round, lost to Lleyton Hewitt)
  Nicolas Kiefer (third round, lost to Roger Federer)
  Feliciano López (quarterfinals, lost to Lleyton Hewitt)
  Richard Gasquet (fourth round, lost to David Nalbandian)
  Jiří Novák (third round, lost to Max Mirnyi)
  Nicolás Massú (second round, lost to Justin Gimelstob)
  Robin Söderling (first round, lost to Igor Andreev)
  Mikhail Youzhny (fourth round, lost to Fernando González)
  Filippo Volandri (first round, lost to Wayne Arthurs)
  Olivier Rochus (second round, lost to Max Mirnyi)

Women's singles
  Lindsay Davenport (final, lost to Venus Williams)
  Maria Sharapova (semifinals, lost to Venus Williams)
  Amélie Mauresmo (semifinals, lost to Lindsay Davenport)
  Serena Williams (third round, lost to Jill Craybas)
  Svetlana Kuznetsova (quarterfinals, lost to Lindsay Davenport)
  Elena Dementieva (fourth round, lost to Anastasia Myskina)
  Justine Henin-Hardenne (first round, lost to Eleni Daniilidou)
  Nadia Petrova (quarterfinals, lost to Maria Sharapova)
  Anastasia Myskina (quarterfinals, lost to Amélie Mauresmo)
  Patty Schnyder (first round, lost to Antonella Serra Zanetti)
  Vera Zvonareva (second round, lost to Květa Peschke)
  Mary Pierce (quarterfinals, lost to Venus Williams)
  Elena Likhovtseva (fourth round, lost to Amélie Mauresmo)
  Venus Williams (champion)
  Kim Clijsters (fourth round, lost to Lindsay Davenport)
  Nathalie Dechy (fourth round, lost to Maria Sharapova)
  Jelena Janković (third round, lost to Anastasia Myskina)
  Tatiana Golovin (first round, lost to Alona Bondarenko)
  Ana Ivanovic (third round, lost to Mary Pierce)
  Daniela Hantuchová (third round, lost to Venus Williams)
  Francesca Schiavone (first round, lost to Kristina Brandi)
  Silvia Farina Elia (third round, lost to Elena Likhovtseva)
  Ai Sugiyama (first round, lost to Roberta Vinci)
  Shinobu Asagoe (first round, lost to Magdalena Maleeva)
  Karolina Šprem (first round, lost to Tamarine Tanasugarn)
  Flavia Pennetta (fourth round, lost to Mary Pierce)
  Nicole Vaidišová (third round, lost to Svetlana Kuznetsova)
  Amy Frazier (first round, lost to Mashona Washington)
  Marion Bartoli (second round, lost to Rika Fujiwara)
  Dinara Safina (third round, lost to Lindsay Davenport)
  Anabel Medina Garrigues (first round, lost to Katarina Srebotnik)
  Virginie Razzano (second round, lost to Cara Black)

Main draw wild card entries
The following players received wild cards into the main draw senior events.

Men's singles
  James Blake
  Alex Bogdanovic
  Josh Goodall
  Alan Mackin
  Jonathan Marray
  Andy Murray
  Mark Philippoussis
  David Sherwood

Women's singles
  Elena Baltacha
  Cara Black
  Sarah Borwell
  Amanda Janes
  Anne Keothavong
  Rebecca Llewellyn
  Katie O'Brien
  Jane O'Donoghue

Men's doubles
  James Auckland /  Dan Kiernan
  Andrew Banks /  Alan Mackin
  Richard Barker /  William Barker
  Alex Bogdanovic /  Josh Goodall
  Mark Hilton /  Jonathan Marray
  Andy Murray /  David Sherwood

Women's doubles
  Elena Baltacha /  Jane O'Donoghue
  Sarah Borwell /  Emily Webley-Smith
  Claire Curran /  Natalie Grandin
  Anna Hawkins /  Rebecca Llewellyn
  Amanda Janes /  Anne Keothavong
  Katie O'Brien /  Melanie South

Mixed doubles
  Jamie Baker /  Claire Curran
  Jamie Delgado /  Amanda Janes
  Andy Murray /  Shahar Pe'er
  Arvind Parmar /  Jane O'Donoghue
  David Sherwood /  Elena Baltacha

Qualifier entries

Men's singles

 Andreas Seppi
 Arnaud Clément
 George Bastl
 Jamie Delgado
 Jeff Morrison
 Antony Dupuis
 Danai Udomchoke
 Gilles Elseneer
 Roko Karanušić
 Dick Norman
 Adrián García
 Lu Yen-hsun
 Noam Okun
 Tuomas Ketola
 Novak Djokovic
 Tobias Summerer

The following players received entry into the lucky loser spot:
 Justin Gimelstob
 Daniele Bracciali
 Paul Goldstein

Women's singles

 Kateřina Böhmová
 Sofia Arvidsson
 Ashley Harkleroad
 Els Callens
 Jamea Jackson
 Meilen Tu
 Saori Obata
 Mara Santangelo
 Sabine Klaschka
 Kateryna Bondarenko
 Julia Vakulenko
 Tatiana Poutchek

The following players received entry into the lucky loser spot:
 Eva Birnerová
 Séverine Beltrame
 Melinda Czink

Men's doubles

 Tuomas Ketola /  Frédéric Niemeyer
 Ramón Delgado /  André Sá
 Robert Lindstedt /  Alexander Peya
 Stephen Huss /  Wesley Moodie (champions)

The following teams received entry into the lucky loser spot:
 Lukáš Dlouhý /  David Škoch
 Ross Hutchins /  Martin Lee

Women's doubles

 Evie Dominikovic /  Aiko Nakamura
 Alona Bondarenko /  Anastasia Rodionova
 Rika Fujiwara /  Saori Obata
 Tatiana Poutchek /  Anastasiya Yakimova

The following teams received entry into the lucky loser spot:
 Yuliana Fedak /  Lilia Osterloh
 Erica Krauth /  Marie-Ève Pelletier
 Edina Gallovits /  Angela Haynes

Withdrawals

Men's Singles
  Andre Agassi → replaced by  Justin Gimelstob
  Guillermo Cañas → replaced by  Paul Goldstein
  Juan Ignacio Chela → replaced by  Thomas Enqvist
  Albert Costa → replaced by  Scott Draper
  Mardy Fish → replaced by  Albert Montañés
  Gastón Gaudio → replaced by  Janko Tipsarević
  Edgardo Massa → replaced by  Björn Phau
  Carlos Moyá → replaced by  Bohdan Ulihrach
  Sjeng Schalken → replaced by  Daniele Bracciali
  Mariano Zabaleta → replaced by  Ivo Minář

Women's Singles
  Elena Bovina → replaced by  Eva Birnerová
  Alicia Molik → replaced by  Melinda Czink
  Paola Suárez → replaced by  Séverine Beltrame

References

External links
 Official Wimbledon Championships website

 
Wimbledon Championships
Wimbledon Championships
Wimbledon Championships
Wimbledon Championships